A Latin-script multigraph is a multigraph consisting of characters of the Latin script.

digraphs (two letters, as ⟨ch⟩ or ⟨ea⟩)
trigraphs (three letters, as ⟨tch⟩ or ⟨eau⟩)
tetragraphs (four letters, as German ⟨tsch⟩)
pentagraphs (five letters, as in the ⟨tzsch⟩ in "Nietzsche")
hexagraphs (six letters, as Irish ⟨eomhai⟩ /oː/)

Lists
 List of Latin-script digraphs
 List of Latin-script trigraphs
 List of Latin-script tetragraphs
 List of Latin-script pentagraphs
 Hexagraph